Birna Tummasardóttir Mikkelsen (born 4 January 1994) is a Faroese football midfielder who currently plays for EB/Streymur/Skála and the Faroe Islands women's national football team.

Honours 

EB/Streymur/Skála

1. deild kvinnur: 2017, 2018
Steypakappingin kvinnur: 2017, 2018

References

External links
 
 
 

1994 births
Living people
Faroese women's footballers
Faroe Islands women's youth international footballers
Faroe Islands women's international footballers
Women's association football midfielders
Faroese people of Icelandic descent